Teotitlán may refer to:

Teotitlán de Flores Magón, town and municipality in Oaxaca, Mexico
Teotitlán del Valle, town and municipality in Oaxaca, Mexico
Teotitlán District, district in Oaxaca, Mexico